Crowdsourcing Week is a global platform committed to helping organizations, innovators and entrepreneurs transition into a more open, connected, and socially productive society enabled by the Internet and online tools powered by the crowds. The company highlights the importance of people-powered or crowd economy practices such as crowdsourcing, crowdfunding, collaborative consumption, sharing economy, and open innovation and among others through global conferences, summits and advisory services, CSW2.

2016 
The next event is organized on November 21–25, 2016 in Brussels, Belgium. Europe’s major crowd economy conference explores the best practices in crowdsourcing and the collaborative economy that are fundamentally changing society, mindsets and possibilities across industries. Five days, sixty sessions and over 70 speakers will be attending the conference. Announced speakers include Andy Ridley, CEO of Circle Economy; Albert Meige, Founder and CEO of Persans; Chiara Chandelise, Founder and CEO of Echomill; Eddy Travia, CEO of Coinsilium;  Marie Noelle Keijzer, Co-founder and CEO of WeForest etc.

In 2016, CSW Global was organized on April 11–15 in London, UK. The 5-day global conference covered actionable topics in crowdsourcing, collaborative innovation and crowdfunding that are increasingly required to thrive in the new economy. Key speakers included Founder & CEO of Innatemotion, Chris Fauconnier; Goncalo Vasconcelos, Co-founder of SyndicateRoom; Ali Clabburn, CEO of Liftshare and many more.

2015 
In 2015, CSW Europe moved to Brussels to host the week-long conference on crowdsourcing and collaborative economy, October 19–23. The conference united European and global decision makers, platforms and practitioners harnessing the new connected economy to address issues centered on government, finance, business and non-profit organizations. Speakers included Alexander de Croo, Deputy Prime Minister of Brussels; Annemie Turtelboom, Viceminister-president and Flemish minister of Finances, Budget and Energy; Joanne Celens, CEO of Synthetron etc.

The CSW Global 2015 took place on April 20–24 in Singapore. The third annual edition gathered on stage leaders from the top companies that comprise the core of the crowd economy and their corporate counterparts to engage in discussion on the future of the crowd economy globally. Speakers included Shelley Kuipers, Co-founder of Better Ventures; Reinaldo Pamponet, Founder of Itsnoon; Will Merritt, CEO of Zooppa; Leo Shimada, Co-founder and CEO of Crowdonomic and more.

Past Events 
 CSW Summit Warsaw with MillionYou (2013)
 CSW Summit Amsterdam with Douw Koren (2013)
 CSW Summit Berlin with Ikosom (2013)
 CSW Global Conference with Microsoft (2013)
 CSW Summit London with KPMG (2013)
 CSW Global Conference with StarHub (2014)
 CSW Summit Brussels with BNP Paribas Fortis (2014)
 CSW Summit Warsaw with MillionYou (2014)
 CSW European Conference with StarHub (2014)
 CSW Summit Jakarta with StartupLokal (2015)
 CSW Summit Venice with H-Farm Ventures (2015)
 CSW Summit Arctic Circle with Lapland Vuollerim (2015)
 CSW Summit Manila with Spark Project (2015)
 CSW Global Conference with SECB (2015)
 CSW Summit Geneva with Catalyx (2015)

References 

Crowdsourcing